Mahmoud "Hamudi" Salman (born 26 July 1979) is an Arab-Israeli professional association football (soccer) player who is currently contracted to Israeli club Hapoel Jerusalem.

Background 
Salman has two brothers, Amer and Mussa, both of whom also became professional footballers with Hapoel Jerusalem.

Playing career 
Midway through the Liga Leumit season of 2008/09, Salman made national news when he deserted the club and stated his intention to continue playing football for Jebel al-Mukaber of the Palestinian West Bank Premier League.

Honours 
 With Hapoel Jerusalem:
 Liga Artzit: 2007/08

Footnotes 

1979 births
Living people
Arab citizens of Israel
Arab-Israeli footballers
Israeli footballers
Palestinian footballers
Association football midfielders
Hapoel Jerusalem F.C. players